Nasireddin is a lunar impact crater that lies in the rugged terrain in the southern part of the Moon's near side. This crater overlaps two older formations, intruding into the crater Miller to the north and Huggins to the west. To the east of Nasireddin is the much larger walled plain Stöfler.

This crater is a younger formation than the two craters it overlies, particularly the worn Huggins to the west. This crater retains much detail, including a terraced inner wall and a sharp rim to the south and east where the inner wall has slumped. The interior floor is relatively level, but rough-surfaced. There are a few low central peaks near the midpoint of the interior, and a few tiny craterlets to mark the surface.

'Nasireddin' has been named after Nasīr al-Dīn Tūsī, a medieval Persian polymath and prominent writer; who is considered to be the greatest of the later Persian scholars. Nasīr al-Dīn Tūsī was an architect, astronomer, biologist, chemist, mathematician, philosopher, physician, physicist, scientist, theologian, and Marja Taqleed (Islamic scholar).

Satellite craters

By convention these features are identified on lunar maps by placing the letter on the side of the crater midpoint that is closest to Nasireddin.

References

External links

 

Impact craters on the Moon